The TT Seawise Giant—earlier Oppama; later Happy Giant, Jahre Viking, Knock Nevis, and Mont—was a ULCC supertanker that was the longest self-propelled ship in history, built in 1974–1979 by Sumitomo Heavy Industries in Yokosuka, Kanagawa, Japan. She possessed the greatest deadweight tonnage ever recorded. Fully laden, her displacement was 657,019 tonnes.

The heaviest self-propelled ship of any kind, and with a laden draft of 24.6 m (81 ft), she was incapable of navigating the English Channel, the Suez Canal or the Panama Canal. Overall, she is generally considered the largest self-propelled ship ever built. In 2013 her overall length was surpassed by 30 m by the Floating Liquified Natural Gas installation Shell Prelude (FLNG), a monohull barge design 488 m long and 600,000 tonnes displacement. Seawise Giant's engines were powered by Ljungström turbines.

She was sunk in 1988 during the Iran–Iraq War, but was later salvaged and restored to service. The vessel was converted to a floating storage and offloading unit (FSO) in 2004, moored off the coast of Qatar in the Persian Gulf at the Al Shaheen Oil Field.

The vessel was sold to Indian ship breakers, and renamed Mont for a final journey in December 2009. After clearing Indian customs, the ship sailed to Alang Ship Breaking Yard, Alang, Gujarat, where she was beached for scrapping. In 2010, scrapping of the ship was completed.

History 

Seawise Giant was ordered in 1974 and delivered in 1979 by Sumitomo Heavy Industries, Ltd. (S.H.I.) at her Oppama shipyard in Yokosuka, Kanagawa, Japan, as a 418,611-ton Ultra Large Crude Carrier (ULCC). The vessel remained unnamed for a long time, and was identified by her hull number, 1016. During sea trials, 1016 exhibited severe vibration problems while going astern. The Greek owner refused to take delivery and the vessel was subject to a lengthy arbitration proceeding. Following settlement, the vessel was sold and named Oppama by S.H.I.

The shipyard exercised its right to sell the vessel and a deal was brokered with Hong Kong Orient Overseas Container Line founder C. Y. Tung to lengthen the ship by several metres and add 146,152 tonnes of cargo capacity through jumboisation. Two years later the ship was relaunched as Seawise Giant. "Seawise", a pun on "C.Y.'s", was used in the names of other ships owned by C.Y. Tung, including Seawise University.

When Seawise Giant was fully loaded its 25 meter/81 foot draft was too deep for the ship to safely navigate the relatively shallow waters of the English Channel. The rudder weighed 230 tons, and the propeller weighed 50 tons.

Seawise Giant was damaged and sunk in 1988 during the Iran–Iraq War by an Iraqi Air Force attack while anchored off Larak Island, Iran on 14 May 1988 and carrying Iranian crude oil. The ship was struck by parachute bombs. Fires ignited aboard the ship and blazed out of control, and it sank in the shallow waters off the coast. The ship was declared a total loss and was written off.

Shortly after the Iran–Iraq war ended, Norman International bought the shipwreck, salvaged and repaired her. The ship was renamed Happy Giant after the repairs. These repairs were done at the Keppel Corporation shipyard in Singapore after towing the vessel from the Persian Gulf. She entered service in October 1991 as Happy Giant.

Jørgen Jahre bought the tanker in 1991 for US$39 million and renamed her Jahre Viking. From 1991 to 2004, she was owned by Loki Stream and flew the flag of Norway.

In 2004, the tanker was purchased by First Olsen Tankers, renamed Knock Nevis, and converted into a permanently moored storage tanker in the Qatar Al Shaheen Oil Field in the Persian Gulf.

Knock Nevis was renamed Mont, and reflagged to Sierra Leone by new owners Amber Development for a final voyage to India where she was scrapped at Alang by Priyablue Industries. The vessel was beached on 22 December 2009. Due to the length and the size of the vessel, scrapping only finished at the end of 2010. The ship's 36 tonne anchor was saved and donated to the Hong Kong Maritime Museum in 2010. It was later moved to a Hong Kong Government Dockyard building on Stonecutters Island.

Size record 

Despite a great length, Seawise Giant was not the largest ship by gross tonnage, ranking sixth at 260,941 GT, behind the crane ship Pioneering Spirit and the four 274,838 to 275,276 GT Batillus-class supertankers. It was the longest and largest by deadweight: 564,763 tonnes.

Seawise Giant was featured on the BBC series Jeremy Clarkson's Extreme Machines while sailing as Jahre Viking.

See also
List of longest ships
TI-class supertanker
Freedom Ship

References

Further reading

External links

1979 ships
Maritime incidents in 1988
Fred. Olsen & Co.
Floating production storage and offloading vessels
Oil tankers
Ships built by Sumitomo Heavy Industries
Iran–Iraq War
Tankers of Norway
Construction records
Steam turbine-powered ships